Intelligence is an American cyber-themed action-adventure television series. The series aired on CBS in the United States, and premiered on January 7, 2014.

On May 10, 2014, CBS cancelled the series after one season. The series was created by Michael Seitzman, who serves as an executive producer along with Tripp Vinson and Barry Schindel, for ABC Studios and CBS Television Studios.

Production
The series was originally scheduled to premiere on February 24, 2014.

Plot
Gabriel Vaughn is a high-tech intelligence operative enhanced with a super-computer microchip in his brain. With this implant, Gabriel is the first human ever to be connected directly into the globalized information grid. He can get into any of its data centers and access key intel files in the fight to protect the United States from its enemies. Lillian Strand, the director of the United States Cyber Command who supports Gabriel and oversees the unit's missions, assigns Secret Service agent Riley Neal to protect Gabriel from outside threats, as well as from his appetite for reckless, unpredictable behaviors and disregard for protocols. Meanwhile, Gabriel takes advantage of his chip to search for his wife who disappeared years ago after being sent by the C.I.A. to infiltrate and prevent the Lashkar-e-Taiba from carrying out a terrorist attack in Mumbai, India.

Cast and characters

Main cast
 Josh Holloway as  Vaughn, an ex–Delta Force operator implanted with a chip that allows him to access the Global Information Grid.
 Marg Helgenberger as  Strand, Director of the U.S. Cyber Command.
 Meghan Ory as U.S. CyberCom Special Agent  Neal, an ex–Secret Service agent assigned to protect Gabriel from external threats.
 Michael Rady as U.S. CyberCom Special Agent Chris 
 John Billingsley as  Cassidy, the neuroscientist responsible for creating the microchip that was implanted in Gabriel's brain.
 P. J. Byrne as  Cassidy, son of Shenendoah Cassidy and one of the scientists working on the Clockwork Project.

Recurring cast
However her chip is more advanced, allowing her to do things Gabriel cannot such as enter his mind. Grace Huang played Mei Chen in the pilot.

Episodes

Cultural references
In episode 13, it was revealed that the name "Clockwork" was based on the 1879 short story "The Ablest Man in the World" by Edward Page Mitchell. The story is about a man who was mute and mentally handicapped and grew up in a mental asylum. His life was changed when a scientist replaced his brain with a clockwork device that intended to make the patient—who has become a Russian baron at the time of the story—become Russia's answer to Napoleon.

Inspiration
The plot is said to have been inspired by the novel Phoenix Island by John Dixon, but some critics have their reservations.

Reception

Critical response
David Hinckley of New York Daily News gave the show three out of five stars. Tim Goodman of The Hollywood Reporter said the show goes overboard on the merging of humans and computer technology. Darren Franich of Entertainment Weekly said "those hoping the show will be Sawyer, P.I. will be disappointed, but there's potential." On Rotten Tomatoes, the series has an aggregate score of 38% based on 13 positive and 21 negative critic reviews.  The website consensus reads: "Intelligence fails to live up to its name, with corny dialogue and overblown violence that cannot be rescued by its capable leading actors."

Awards and nominations

See also

 Chuck (TV series)
 Jake 2.0
 Scorpion (TV series)

References

External links
 
 
 

2013 American television series debuts
2013 American television series endings
American action television series
2010s American drama television series
2010s American science fiction television series
English-language television shows
Espionage television series
CBS original programming
Television series by ABC Studios
Television series by CBS Studios
Television shows set in Virginia
Television shows set in Los Angeles
Television shows based on American novels
Anti-Iranian sentiments
Malware in fiction
Works about computer hacking